Kang Yi-chan (born 9 January 2001) is a South Korean professional footballer who plays as a winger for Malaysia Super League club Kelantan.

Early life and career

As a youth player, Kang played for Kyung Hee University.

Club career

Kang started his career with Gangwon.

After that, he signed for Kelantan. He impressed the manager and supporters with his performances while on trial.

International career

Kang has represented South Korea at youth level.

Style of play

Kang mainly operates as a winger.

Career statistics

Club

References

External links

2001 births
Living people
Association football midfielders
South Korean footballers
South Korea youth international footballers
Gangwon FC players
K League 1 players
Malaysia Super League players
Kelantan F.C. players